The Swaziland Progressive Party was the first political party founded in Swaziland.

Background
A Progressive Association was founded in 1929 under the auspices of the Resident Commissioner of the British Empire.  In 1935, the Association had less than 100 members. In 1939, the Association split into Swazi and non-Swazi camps. John Nquku became President of the Association in 1945.

Party
The Association was transformed into a party in 1959-1960 by Nquku, who had travelled and met many European and American politicians. The party set about on the path to self-government and then independence. In 1962, Nquku was deposed as Party President and replaced with Ambrose Zwane. By appealing to the British government for democratic institutions to be included in the Swazi constitution, the SPP managed to secure a place in the 1964 general election. However, when the election showed widespread support in Swazi society for King Sobhuza II, the party lost influence.

Policies
The SPP had a four-point program: Non-racial universal enfranchisement, opposition to incorporation into South Africa, adoption of the United Nations Declaration of Human Rights, and integration of Swaziland's white minority and Swazi majority and ending racial discrimination.

References

A History of Post-War Africa, John Hatch, 1965

1959 establishments in Swaziland
1973 disestablishments in Swaziland
Anti-racist organizations in Africa
Banned political parties
Defunct political parties in Eswatini
Nationalist parties in Africa
Political parties disestablished in 1973
Political parties established in 1959
Progressive parties